"Singing Hills" is a song written by Mack David, Dick Sanford, and Sammy Mysels.

Slim Whitman released it as a single (Imperial 8267, with "I Hate to See You Cry" on the flip side) in 1954.

Track listing

Charts

References 

1954 songs
1954 singles
Imperial Records singles
Slim Whitman songs
Songs written by Mack David